The 1976 World 600, the 17th running of the event, was a Winston Cup Series racing event that took place on May 30, 1976, at Charlotte Motor Speedway in Concord, North Carolina.

Race report
The five drivers that dominated the 1976 NASCAR Winston Cup Series season were David Pearson (average finish of 7th place), Cale Yarborough (average finish of 8th place), Richard Petty (average finish of 9th place), Benny Parsons (average finish of 10th place), and Bobby Allison (average finish 12th place).

Four hundred laps took place spanning . It took four hours and twenty-two minutes for David Pearson to defeat Richard Petty under the race's final yellow flag in front of 103,000 spectators.  

Pearson would earn the pole position with a speed of  while the race's average speed would be ; he would clinch his third career World 600 win at this event along with his final win ever at Charlotte. Dale Earnhardt ran a #30 Army Special Chevrolet scheme at this event. Terry Ryan was the last-place finisher  due to a hub problem on lap 11.
 Wisconsin short track ace Dick Trickle did a one-off in a second car, the #99 Ford, for the Junie Donlavey team, blew an engine and retired before halfway. Seven cautions slowed the race for 38 laps (including the 400th lap of the race). 

For the first 245 laps the primary battle was between Pearson and Yarborough as the lead officially changed 33 times in that span and 37 in all.  Yarborough cut a tire and finished a lap down in third.  

David Pearson's next pole position would be at Riverside International Raceway two weeks later; he would win eight poles overall that year including at the  1976 National 500; which took place that October.

Bobby Isaac blew his engine and spun at Lap 46; it would be his final Winston Cup start. It was ironic that Isaac’s career ended in the World 600, as his debut came fifteen years earlier when, as a favor, he started and parked Junior Johnson's car in the qualifying race for this historic event. 

Janet Guthrie would make her debut here. She was invited to attempt this race by Humpy Wheeler after failing to qualify for the 1976 Indianapolis 500. Guthrie finished her first stock car race in 15th place and drove well over 500 miles in the process, silencing some of the era's critics who thought women wouldn't be able to go the distance in long oval races.

Notable crew chiefs who participated in this race included Junie Donlavey, Jake Elder, Harry Hyde, Dale Inman, and Bud Moore.

Race earnings for each driver ranged from the winner's share of $49,990 ($ when adjusted for inflation) to the last-place finisher's earnings of $885 ($ when adjusted for inflation). The total prize purse sanctioned by NASCAR for this event was $225,025 ($ when adjusted for inflation).

Qualifying

Box Score
Cautions: 7 for 38 lapsMargin of victory: under caution

(5) Indicates 5 bonus points added to normal race points scored for leading 1 lap(10) Indicates 10 bonus points added to normal race points scored for leading 1 lap & leading the most laps.

Lap Leader Breakdown
Lead changes: 37

Standings after the race

References

World 600
World 600
NASCAR races at Charlotte Motor Speedway